The Mexican Federal Judicial Weekly contains the published  of the judiciary of Mexico.

The decisions of the Supreme Court are binding on lower courts as  only upon five consecutive and uninterrupted decisions approved by at least eight justices when in plenary sessions or by at least four justices when in chambers. The decisions of the Collegiate Circuit Courts are  provided they are based upon five consecutive and uninterrupted decisions approved by unanimity of votes of the magistrates who compose each collegiate court.

Such decisions are published through its gazette.

The  is broken down into series of nine . The first four  (1871–1910) are called  and are not binding; the  starting with the fifth  (1918–1957) are binding. The most recent is the tenth  (October 2011–).

In some jurisdictions, there may also exist executive administrative courts, which are not bound by these .

References

External links
 Federal Judicial Weekly from the Supreme Court